The 2013 Copa Centroamericana will be the 2nd edition of the Copa Centroamericana competition and 12th UNCAF-. Costa Rica will be the host nation. The competition is scheduled to begin on January 18, 2013 and the final took place on January 27, 2013. Every national team's roster consists of 21 players with three goalkeepers included

Group A

Belize 
Head coach:  Leroy Sherrier Lewis

Costa Rica 
Head coach:  Jorge Luis Pinto

Guatemala 
Head coach:  Ever Hugo Almeida

Nicaragua
Head coach:  Enrique Llena

Group B

El Salvador 
Head coach:  Agustín Castillo

Honduras 
Head coach:  Luis Fernando Suárez

Panama 
Head coach:  Julio Dely Valdés

References

Copa Centroamericana squads
squads